The Corporacion Andina de Fomento (CAF) – Banco de Desarrollo de América Latina (is a development bank that has a mission of stimulating sustainable development and regional integration by financing projects in the public and private sectors in Latin America, and providing technical cooperation and other specialized services. Founded in 1970 and currently with 19 member countries from Latin America, the Caribbean, and Europe along with 13 private banks, CAF is one of the main sources of multilateral financing and an important generator of knowledge for the region.

CAF is headquartered in Caracas, Venezuela. Additionally, it has Representative Offices in  Madrid, Lima, Brasilia, Bogota, Buenos Aires, Quito, Panama, Montevideo, Asuncion, Mexico City, Port Spain and La Paz.

History
The CAF was founded in 1966 following the historic signing of the Bogotá Declaration in the presence of its framers, President Carlos Lleras Restrepo of Colombia, President Eduardo Frei Montalva of Chile, President Raúl Leoni of Venezuela, and the personal representatives of the presidents of Ecuador and Peru. The government of Bolivia would join later in 1967. In 1967, a Joint Commission, set up to address regional issues, mapped out the basic principles of CAF, and on February 7, 1968 the member countries governments signed its Establishing Agreement in San Carlos Palace, Bogotá. The Corporation was conceived as a multipurpose bank and agency for promoting Andean development and integration. Two years later on June 8, 1970, after opening its headquarters in Caracas, Venezuela, CAF formally began operations.

The Cartagena Agreement was signed in May 1969 one year after CAF Establishing Agreement which created the political framework for the Andean subregional group. CAF began operations with a subscribed capital of $25 million.

In 1971, Bolivia and Ecuador became the first countries to receive loans for the execution of projects: a rice storage network ($1.3 million) and a fisheries complex for catching and freezing tropical tuna ($0.5 million).

Member states

 Argentina
 Barbados 
 Bolivia
 Brazil
 Chile
 Colombia
 Costa Rica
 Dominican Republic
 Ecuador
 Jamaica
 Mexico
 Panama
 Paraguay
 Peru
 Portugal
 Spain
 Trinidad and Tobago
 Uruguay
 Venezuela

See also

Caribbean Development Bank

References

External links

Multilateral development banks
Andean Community